Starosaitovo (İśke Säyet) is a rural locality (a village) in Kulguninsky Selsoviet, Ishimbaysky District, Bashkortostan, Russia. The population was 177 as of 2010. There are 4 streets.

Geography 
Starosaitovo is located 94 km northeast of Ishimbay (the district's administrative centre) by road. Kulgunino is the nearest rural locality.

References 

Rural localities in Ishimbaysky District
Ufa Governorate